Alexander Indrajith Obeysekere (March 1918 – 28 April 2002) was a Ceylonese sportsman. He won a Bronze medal at the 1950 British Empire Games. He was the welterweight champion in the 1940s and was a member of the Ceylon contingent to the 1948 Olympic Games. He went on the represented Ceylon in boxing in 1950 Commonwealth Games in Auckland winning the Bronze medal in welterweight.

He was born in Colombo to Donald Obeyesekere and was educated the Royal College, Colombo.

References

External links
 

1918 births
2002 deaths
Sportspeople from Colombo
Sri Lankan male boxers
Bantamweight boxers
Olympic boxers of Sri Lanka
Boxers at the 1948 Summer Olympics
Boxers at the 1950 British Empire Games
Commonwealth Games bronze medallists for Sri Lanka
Alumni of Royal College, Colombo
Commonwealth Games medallists in boxing
Medallists at the 1950 British Empire Games